Women have made significant contributions to literature since the earliest written texts. Women have been at the forefront of textual communication since early civilizations.

History

Among the first known female writers is Enheduanna; she is also the earliest known poet ever recorded. She was the High Priestess of the goddess Inanna and the moon god Nanna (Sin). She lived in the Sumerian city-state of Ur over 4,200 years ago.  Enheduanna's contributions to Sumerian literature, definitively ascribed to her, include several personal devotions to Inanna and a collection of hymns known as the "Sumerian Temple Hymns". Further additional texts are ascribed to her. This makes her the first named author in world history.  She was the first known woman to hold the title of EN, a role of great political importance that was often held by royal daughters. She was appointed to the role by her father, King Sargon of Akkad. Her mother was probably Queen Tashlultum. 
Enheduanna was appointed to the role of High Priestess in a shrewd political move by Sargon to help secure power in the south of his kingdom, where the City of Ur was located.

7th century B.C.E.
Sappho (Aeolic Greek  Psapphô; c. 630 – c. 570 BCE) was an archaic Greek poet from the island of Lesbos. Sappho is known for her lyric poetry, written to be sung while accompanied by a lyre. Most of Sappho's poetry is now lost, and what is extant has survived only in fragmentary form, except for one complete poem: the "Ode to Aphrodite". As well as lyric poetry, ancient commentators claimed that Sappho wrote elegiac and iambic poetry. Three epigrams attributed to Sappho are extant, but these are actually Hellenistic imitations of Sappho's style.
In 3rd Century, Tamil poetess named, the Avvaiyar who lived during the Sangam period is considered to be contemporary to poets Paranar,[1] Kabilar and Thiruvalluvar.[1] She is attributed as the author of 7 verses in Naṟṟiṇai, 15 in Kuṟuntokai, 4 in Akanaṉūṟu and 33 in Puṟanāṉūṟu.[1] Legend states that she was a court poet of the rulers of the Tamil country. She travelled from one part of the country to another and from one village to another, sharing the gruel of the poor farmers and composing songs for their enjoyment. Most of her songs were about a small-time chieftain Vallal Athiyamaan Nedumaan Anji and his family.[1] The chieftain had also used her as his ambassador to avert war with another neighbouring chieftain Thondaiman.[1] The rest of her songs related to the various aspects of state governance.

11th century

The Tale of Genji was written in the early 11th century by the noblewoman Murasaki Shikibu and is considered by some to be the first novel.

12th century

Anna Komnene, the daughter of the Emperor Alexios I Komnenos, wrote Alexiad around 1148. It was written in a form of artificial Attic Greek. Anna described the political and military history of the Byzantine Empire during the reign of her father, thus providing a significant account on the Byzantium of the High Middle Ages. Among other topics, the Alexiad documents the Byzantine Empire's interaction with the Crusades and highlights the conflicting perceptions of the East and West in the early 12th century. It does not mention the schism of 1054 – a topic which is very common in contemporary writing. Nevertheless it successfully documents firsthand the decline of Byzantine cultural influence in both eastern and western Europe, particularly in the West's increasing involvement in its geographic sphere.

15th century

Christine de Pizan was the best known late medieval French writer, rhetorician, and critic, who wrote Book of the City of Ladies in 1405, a text about an allegorical city in which independent women lived free from the slander of men. In her work she included real women artists, such as Anastasia, who was considered one of the best Parisian illuminators, although none of her work has survived. Other humanist texts led to increased education for Italian women.

The first known book in English by a woman was Revelations of Divine Love by Julian of Norwich.  It was written between the fourteenth and fifteenth centuries and survived in various manuscripts until it was first published in 1670.

16th century

Gulbadan Banu, daughter of Mughal Emperor Babur, wrote the biography of her brother, Emperor Humayun.

18th century
Ann Radcliffe authored several novels of gothic fiction including The Mysteries of Udolpho published in 1794 and The Italian from 1797.

19th century

One of the best known 19th-century female writers was Jane Austen, author of Sense and Sensibility (1811), Pride and Prejudice (1813), Mansfield Park (1814) and Emma (1816), who achieved success as a published writer. She wrote two additional novels, Northanger Abbey and Persuasion, both published posthumously in 1818, and began another, eventually titled Sanditon, but died before its completion.

Writers from this period include:

A-K

 Mercedes Laura Aguiar
 Mastoureh Ardalan
 Angélique Arnaud
 Caroline de Barrau
 Ada Buisson
 Anna Ciundziewicka
 Umihana Čuvidina
 Countess Dash
 Nicole Garay
 María Josefa García Granados
 Gertrudis Gómez de Avellaneda,
 Zafer Hanım
 Julie Hausmann
 Bohuslava Kecková
 Lydia Koidula
 Hanna K. Korany
 Maria Konopnicka
 Eliška Krásnohorská

L-R

 Jeanne Lapauze
 Hermance Lesguillon
 Jeanne Marni
 Dada Masiti
 Emilie Maresse-Paul
 Marion A. McBride
 Athénaïs Michelet
 Maryam al-Nahhas
 Eugénie Niboyet
 Božena Němcová
 Nodira
 Virginia Elena Ortea
 Elise Otté
 Eliza Orzeszkowa
 Pavlina Pajk
 Eliška Pešková
 Gabriela Preissová
 Maria Rodziewiczówna
 Mary D. Rosengarten
 Lady Mary Wroth

S-Z

 Rosa Schapire
 Mary Shelley
 Staka Skenderova
 Milica Stojadinović-Srpkinja
 Lilli Suburg
 Bertha von Suttner
 Karolina Světlá
 Elizabeth Hart Thwaites
 Josefa Toledo de Aguerri
 Fatma Aliye Topuz
 Flora Tristan
 Lesya Ukrainka
 Salomé Ureña
 Jahonotin Uvaysiy
 Dolores Veintimilla
 Mary Wollstonecraft
 Warda al-Yaziji
 Rosalind Amelia Young
 Gabriela Zapolska
 Narcyza Żmichowska

The followed is a list of interdisciplinary female writers of the 19th century:

 Kate Greenaway: writer, and illustrator, author (writer and designer) of two children's book illustrations; Marigold Garden (1875) and Under the Window (1879).
 Kate Bunce: was an English painter and poet associated with the Arts and Crafts movement.
 Elizabeth Siddal: English artist, poet, and artists' model.
 Delphine Arnould de Cool-Fortin: French painter and writer on Limoges porcelain. 
 Dora d'Istria: painter, poet and writer.
 Milena Mrazović: journalist, writer, and piano composer.
 Aşıq Pəri: poet and folk singer.
 Josipina Turnograjska: writers, poets, and composer.
 Zoila Ugarte de Landívar: writer, journalist, sculptor, suffragist, and feminist.

20th century

In the 20th century women produced many books of all genres. Among fiction books can be named such titles as Harry Potter and The House of the Spirits, among others. The following is a list of female writers of the 20th century:

Kathy Acker
Isabel Allende: Chilean writer.
Gloria E. Anzaldúa
Matilde Asensi
Lucia Berlin
Octavia E. Butler
Rosario Castellanos Figueroa
Amparo Dávila
Guadalupe Dueñas
María Dueñas
Diamela Eltit
Espido Freire
Gloria Fuertes
Almudena Grandes
Joy Harjo
Clara Janés
Carmen Laforet
Elvira Lindo
Clarice Lispector
Latasha Long
Leslie Marmon Silko
Carmen Martín Gaite
Ana María Matute
Rosa Montero
Toni Morrison
Silvina Ocampo
Alejandra Pizarnik
Soledad Puértolas
Claudia Rankine
J. K. Rowling: Author of Harry Potter series.
Maruja Torres
Jeanette Winterson

Women awarded the Nobel Prize in Literature

The followed women have won the Nobel Prize in Literature:

 Selma Lagerlöf
 Grazia Deledda
 Sigrid Undset
 Pearl S. Buck
 Gabriela Mistral
 Nelly Sachs
 Nadine Gordimer
 Toni Morrison
 Wisława Szymborska
 Elfriede Jelinek
 Doris Lessing
 Herta Müller
 Alice Munro
 Svetlana Alexievich
 Olga Tokarczuk
 Louise Glück
 Annie Ernaux

See also
 Scientific writing
 Women's writing (literary category)
 List of women writers
 Women letter writers
 Women in science
 Women artists

Additional reading

 "Some Women Writers," St. Louis Daily Globe-Democrat, March 16, 1884, image 6 Summary and review of book, English Poetesses: A Series of Critical Biographies by Eric S. Robertson

 Edith Sessions Tuffer, "Women Who Scribble," The Wichita (Kansas) Daily Eagle, September 25, 1890, image 6 A woman describes "their work and their troubles." The same article appeared in many other newspapers.

 "Characteristics of Woman Writers," New York Sun, quoted in The Argus, Rock Island, Illinois, 14 April 1893, image 6

 "Chroniclings," Rochester (New York) Democrat and Chronicle, 24 March 1896, image 6, argues against custom by some women writers of adopting a man's name

 Frederic J. Haskin, "The Modern Woman: XXVI — Women Writers," Evening Star, Washington, D.C., 25 April 1913, image 11
 P.R., "Woman Writers of To-day," The Age, Melbourne, 22 September 1945, image 9
 Beatrice Campbell, "Writer's Room With a View," The Guardian, 21 February 1989, image 35 (assembly of women writers from the USSR, the United States, and France
" The Persephone Book of Short Stories," Persephone Books Ltd. 2012, ISBN 978-1903-155-905 is a collection of short stories written by women 1909-1986.

Notes

References

.

 
Women and the arts
[[Edward Jewitt Robinson (2001). Tamil Wisdom: Traditions Concerning Hindu Sages and Selections from Their Writings. New Delhi: Asian Educational Services.
Krishnamurti, Dr. C.R. (Professor Emeritus, University of British Columbia, Vancouver, B.C. Canada) Thamizh Literature Through the Ages [1]]]